Katherine Merchant Snyder (born 1970) is an American politician serving as Mayor of Portland, Maine since 2019. Prior to her election as mayor, she served as executive director of the Portland Education Foundation, a non-profit which raised funds for Portland Public Schools.

Snyder also served on the Portland Board of Education from 2007-2013, including time as chair. From 2009 to 2011, Snyder served as an Executive Director of the Maine Department of Corrections.

In the 2019 Portland, Maine mayoral election. Snyder defeated incumbent Ethan Strimling and two other challengers, winning each of the city's 12 districts and earning 62% of the overall vote.

Campaign
During her campaign for mayor, Snyder emphasized her skills as a collaborative leader and consensus builder, someone focused on putting public service ahead of personal ambition. On October 17, 2019, she received the endorsement of the Portland Press Herald, which pointed to what they described as her record of fiscal responsibility and strong communication while serving on the School Board during the Great Recession and underscored the need for change in Portland city leadership, which had been characterized by ongoing tension between the sitting mayor, city councilors, and the City Manager. She was viewed as an ally of city manager Jon Jennings, "whose vocal opposition to Strimling's re-election all but functioned as an endorsement of his most competitive challengers." Among her policies, she opposed a $15 municipal minimum wage, supported the elimination of fares "for the city's METRO bus system for middle-and high school students," and sought to give long-term leases of city property to housing developers committed to building affordable housing.

Mayor
When former New York City mayor and billionaire businessman Michael Bloomberg campaigned in Portland in January 2020 during the 2020 Democratic primary, Snyder was among those he spoke with during a campaign stop at Becky's Diner. It was unclear whether this meeting was an official endorsement. In June 2020 Portland Black Lives Matter activists released demands after days of protesting including the dismissal of city manager Jon Jennings, to which Snyder responded by declaring "The city manager has my full support." In June 2020 Snyder sought permission from the city council to allow private citizens to paint a Black Lives Matter mural in front of Portland City Hall. In September, Snyder appointed 13 members to a Racial Equity Steering Committee. In January 2021, after many Portland residents received threatening, homophobic letters, Snyder joined the city council in urging residents to fly the Pride flag.

Personal life
Snyder earned her B.A. from Skidmore College in New York and a M.A. in Public Policy & Management from the Muskie School at the University of Southern Maine as well as a Certificate of Graduate Studies in Applied Research and Evaluation Methods. She is married, lives in the city's Oakdale neighborhood, and has 3 children who were educated in the Portland Public Schools system.

References

1970 births
American nonprofit executives
Living people
Maine Democrats
Mayors of Portland, Maine
Portland, Maine School Board members
Skidmore College alumni
University of Southern Maine alumni
Women mayors of places in Maine
21st-century American women